This is a record of the Netherlands at the FIFA World Cup. The Netherlands entered qualification for 19 of the 22 FIFA World Cup tournaments to date, qualifying 11 times. They have a record of 3 World Cup final appearances (as of 2022) without winning the tournament.

After appearing in two consecutive World Cup finals in 1974 and 1978, the team had their biggest World Cup streak in the 1990s, reaching three straight tournaments. In 1990, two years after the European Championship at the UEFA Euro 1988, the Dutch went out in the Round of 16, defeated by West Germany. In 1994 Netherlands was eliminated by Brazil in the quarter-finals, and in 1998 lost to Brazil in the semi-finals and Croatia in the third-place play-off. Netherlands returned in 2006, being eliminated by Portugal in the Round of 16, a game known as the Battle of Nuremberg. In 2010 the team reached their third World Cup final, this time losing to Spain.  The Dutch avenged this loss during the first match of the following 2014 World Cup, routing the Spanish 5–1, and eventually going on to their first third-place finish. After missing the 2018 World Cup, they returned in 2022, being eliminated in the quarter-final stage. The Dutch have never lost a World Cup match in regular time by more than one goal, and have not lost a match since the 2010 final, their 2014 and 2022 campaigns both ending in defeat by way of penalty shoot-out and both by Argentina.

Record at the FIFA World Cup

By match

Record by opponent

Italy 1934

France 1938

West Germany 1974

Round 2

Final

Argentina 1978

Round 2

Final

Italy 1990

Round of 16

United States 1994

Round of 16

Quarterfinals

France 1998

Round of 16

Quarterfinals

Semifinal

Third place match

Germany 2006

Round of 16

South Africa 2010

Round of 16

Quarter-finals

Semi-final

Final

Brazil 2014

Netherlands used all 23 players during the 2014 World Cup, making it the first team in World Cup history to ever use all of its squad players. The team avenged their 2010 loss to Spain by defeating the defending champions with a stunning 5–1 victory in their opening game. They went on to achieve their first third place in any World Cup.

Group winner advance to play runner-up of Group A in the round of 16
Group runner-up advance to play winner of Group A in the round of 16

Round of 16

Quarter-final

Semi final

Third place match

Qatar 2022

Group stage

Knockout stage

Round of 16

Quarter-finals

Record players

Top goalscorers

References

External links 
 KVNB official site (in Dutch)
 FIFA Official Ranking of all Participants at Finals 1930–2002. FIFA Match Results for all Stages 1930–2002
 FIFA official site

 
Countries at the FIFA World Cup
World Cup